Alumni Field is a stadium in Frankfort, Kentucky.  It is primarily used for American football, and is the home field of Kentucky State University. Also there are baseball, football and softball coaching offices, as well as  locker rooms, an athletic training room, media room and weight room. New synthetic turf was laid at the end of 2019 with anticipated completion date for June 2020.

References

College football venues
Kentucky State Thorobreds football
American football venues in Kentucky
Buildings and structures in Frankfort, Kentucky